The National Emergencies Act (NEA) (codified at –1651) is a United States federal law passed to end all previous national emergencies and to formalize the emergency powers of the President.

The Act empowers the President to activate special powers during a crisis but imposes certain procedural formalities when invoking such powers. The perceived need for the law arose from the scope and number of laws granting special powers to the executive in times of national emergency. Congress can terminate an emergency declaration with a joint resolution enacted into law.  Powers available under this Act are limited to the 136 emergency powers Congress has defined by law.

The legislation was signed by President Gerald Ford on September 14, 1976.  , 60 national emergencies have been declared, more than 30 of which remain in effect.

Background
The first President to issue an emergency proclamation was Woodrow Wilson, who on February 5, 1917, issued the following:

This proclamation was within the limits of the act that established the United States Shipping Board. The first president to declare a national emergency was President Abraham Lincoln, during the American Civil War. Starting with Franklin D. Roosevelt in 1933, presidents asserted the power to declare emergencies without limiting their scope or duration, without citing the relevant statutes, and without congressional oversight. The Supreme Court in Youngstown Sheet & Tube Co. v. Sawyer limited what a president could do in such an emergency, but did not limit the emergency declaration power itself. A 1973 Senate investigation found (in Senate Report 93-549) that four declared emergencies remained in effect: the 1933 banking crisis with respect to the hoarding of gold, a 1950 emergency with respect to the Korean War, a 1970 emergency regarding a postal workers strike, and a 1971 emergency in response to inflation. Many provisions of statutory law are contingent on a declaration of national emergency, as many as 500 by one count. It was due in part to concern that a declaration of "emergency" for one purpose should not invoke every possible executive emergency power, that Congress in 1976 passed the National Emergencies Act.

Presidents have continued to use their emergency authority subject to the provisions of the act, with 42 national emergencies declared between 1976 and 2007. Most of these were for the purpose of restricting trade with certain foreign entities under the International Emergency Economic Powers Act (IEEPA) (50 U.S.C. 1701–1707).

Provisions

Termination of presidential authority
A prior Senate investigation had found 470 provisions of federal law that a President might invoke via a declaration of emergency. The Act repealed several of these provisions and stated that prior emergency declarations would no longer give force to those provisions that remained.  Congress did not attempt to revoke any outstanding emergency declarations per se, as these remained the President's prerogative under Article Two of the United States Constitution.

Procedure for new emergencies and rescinding emergency declarations
The Act authorizes the President to activate emergency provisions of law via an emergency declaration on the condition that the President specifies the provisions so activated and notifies Congress. An activation would expire if the President expressly terminated the emergency, or did not renew the emergency annually, or if each house of Congress passed a resolution terminating the emergency. After presidents objected to this "Congressional termination" provision on separation of powers grounds, and the Supreme Court in INS v. Chadha (1983) held such provisions to be an unconstitutional legislative veto, it was replaced in 1985 with termination by an enacted joint resolution. A joint resolution passed by both chambers requires presidential signature, giving the president veto power over the termination (requiring a two-thirds majority in both houses in the case of a contested termination). The Act also requires the President and executive agencies to maintain records of all orders and regulations that proceed from use of emergency authority, and to regularly report the cost incurred to Congress.

Exceptions
Certain emergency authorities were exempted from the act at the time of its passage:
 10 USC 2304(a)(1) – allowing exemption of national defense contracts from competitive bidding
 10 USC 3313, 6386(c) and 8313 – regulating the promotion, retirement and separation of military officers
 12 USC 95(a) – regulating transactions in foreign gold and silver
 40 USC 278(b) – regulating federal property purchases and contracts
 41 USC 15 and 203 – limiting the assignment of claims against the federal government
 50 USC 1431–1435 – enabling the President to make national defense contracts outside of otherwise applicable rules

The list of exceptions has from time to time been revised. For example, Public Law 95-223 (1977) repealed the emergency clause of 12 USC 95(a) and arranged for its authority to expire according to the normal provisions of the NEA.

Emergency powers
Congress has delegated at least 136 distinct statutory emergency powers to the President, each available upon the declaration of an emergency.  Only 13 of these require a declaration from Congress; the remaining 123 are assumed by an executive declaration with no further Congressional input.

Congressionally-authorized emergency presidential powers are sweeping and dramatic, and range from suspending all laws regulating chemical and biological weapons, including the ban on human testing (passed 1969); to suspending any Clean Air Act implementation plan or excess emissions penalty upon petition of a state governor (passed 1977); to authorizing military construction projects (passed 1982) using any existing defense appropriations for such military constructions ($10.4 billion in FY2018); to drafting any retired Coast Guard officers (passed 1963) or enlisted members (passed 1949) into active duty regardless of ineligibility for Selective Service.

Invocations

As of March 2020, 60 national emergencies had been declared, with 31 of them being renewed annually. These include the eight that were declared prior to the passage of the 1976 Act. The longest continuing national emergency dates back to November 1979 by the Carter administration blocking Iranian government property under the International Emergency Economic Powers Act.

Since passage of the National Emergencies Act in 1976, every U.S. President has declared multiple national emergencies: Carter (2); Reagan: (6); H.W. Bush (4); Clinton (17); W. Bush (12); Obama: (13); Trump (7).

Other emergency frameworks
Beyond the National Emergencies Act, Congress has established three other emergency power frameworks:
  – Public Health Service Act (1944), as amended.
  et seq. – Stafford Act (1988), replacing the Disaster Relief Act of 1974, as amended in 2000 and 2006.
  – Foreign Assistance Act of 1961, as amended, including by the Arms Export Control Act (1962)

See also
 List of national emergencies in the United States
 Continuity of Government Plan
 National Security and Homeland Security Presidential Directive
 Rex 84
 United States national emergency with respect to Iran
 International Emergency Economic Powers Act
 Presidential Emergency Action Documents

References

Further reading 

 Yu Ouyang and Michael A. Morgan. 2019. "The Contemporary Presidency How Presidents Utilize Their Emergency Powers." Presidential Studies Quarterly. 

 "Toward Comprehensive Reform of America's Emergency Law Regime," including compendium of national emergency powers

External links
 National Emergencies Act as amended (PDF/details) in the GPO Statute Compilations collection
 National Emergencies Act as enacted (details) in the US Statutes at Large
A Guide to Emergency Powers and Their Use. Brennan Center for Justice
The Alarming Scope of the President's Emergency Powers  The Atlantic.  Jan/Feb 2019.

1976 in law
94th United States Congress
United States federal defense and national security legislation
Emergency laws in the United States
Civil detention in the United States
Continuity of government in the United States